Party 7 is a 2000 Japanese surreal comedy film directed by Katsuhito Ishii, distributed by Tohokushinsha Film Corporation.

Plot

Cast 
 Masatoshi Nagase as Miki
 Keisuke Horibe as Sonoda
 Akemi Kobayashi as Kana
 Yoshinori Okada as Todohira
 Yoshio Harada as Captain Banana
 Tadanobu Asano as Okita
 Tatsuya Gasyuin as Wakagashira

Reception

References

External links  
 
 Party 7 Trailer of the movie on YouTube.

2000 films
2000s Japanese-language films
Films directed by Katsuhito Ishii
2000s Japanese films
Films produced by Kazutoshi Wadakura